Brain Games is an American popular science television series that explores cognitive science by focusing on illusions, psychological experiments, and counterintuitive thinking. The series debuted on National Geographic in 2011 as a special. Its return as an original series in 2013 set a record for the highest premiere rating for any National Geographic original series with 1.5 million viewers.

Neil Patrick Harris was the unseen narrator in the first season, replaced by Jason Silva for the remainder of the series as its host and presenter; in addition, sleight-of-hand artist Apollo Robbins has been a frequent consultant and illusionist guest on the show. As time passed, Magician Eric Leclerc took over this role in seasons 4 and 5. The show is interactive, encouraging television viewers, often along with a handful of live volunteers, to engage in visual, auditory, and other cognitive experiments, or "brain games", that emphasize the main points presented in each episode. Experts like Sri Sarma also explain why humans react in a certain way because of the brain.

The series is deemed acceptable for use toward E/I credits, and Litton Entertainment added repurposed reruns of the show to its One Magnificent Morning block in fall 2017.

In December 2019, it was announced that a new format of this series, hosted by Keegan-Michael Key, would premiere on January 20, 2020; neuroscientist Daniel Levitin was brought in as a script consultant for the season to ensure accuracy. Its sneak peek was played on December 29, 2019. On January 17, 2020, a ninth season was announced, but production was delayed due to the COVID-19 pandemic. The ninth season was branded as "Brain Games: On the Road", and was hosted by Chuck Nice and was released on both National Geographic and Disney+.

Cast

Main
Neil Patrick Harris – Narrator (season 1)
Jason Silva – host (season 2–7)
Keegan-Michael Key – host (season 8)
Chuck Nice – host (season 9–present)
Apollo Robbins – sleight-of-hand artist, "deception specialist" (season 1)
Eric Leclerc – illusionist
Max Darwin – illusionist
Ben Bailey – comedian
Jay Painter – comedian (season 2 episode 5, "Power of Persuasion")
Andrei Jikh – cardist (season 4 episode 9, "Patterns")
Shara Ashley Zeiger – improviser
Bill Hobbs – author
Jordan Hirsch – improviser
Amanda Hirsch – improviser
Lior Suchard – mentalist (season 8)

Featured
Art Shapiro – American University
Amy Bastian
Alex Todorov – Princeton University
Brady Barr
Brian Scholl – Yale University
Coren Apicella – psychologist, University of Pennsylvania
Chess Stetson – Caltech
Dan Simons
Daniel Goldstein – Microsoft Research
Frans de Waal – Emory University
Forrest Griffin – UFC fighter (season 3 episode 8, "Mind Your Body")
Helen Fisher –  anthropologist , Rutgers University
Jim Coan – psychologist, University of Virginia
Jonah Berger – University of Pennsylvania
Joshua Ackerman – MIT
Kamran Fallahpour – Brain Resource Center
Karen Wynn
Laurie R. Santos – Yale University
Mark Changizi – theoretical neurobiologist
Michael Bisping – UFC fighter (season 3 episode 8, "Mind Your Body)
Rhoda Boone – Food artist (season 4 episode 7, "Food")
Shankar Vedantam – NPR science correspondent
Steve Schirripa (season 2 episode 12, "Liar, Liar")
Susan Carnell – Johns Hopkins University
Suzanne Dikker – New York University
Sri Sarma – Asst. Professor, Johns Hopkins University
Scott Barry Kaufman
Sara Mednick – University of California
Harrison Greenbaum – Debunker of Physic Phenomenon (season 4 episode 6, "Superstition")
 Dave Goelz – Dr. Bunsen Honeydew
 David Rudman – Beaker
Daniel Levitin – Professor, McGill University

Production
National Geographic announced that the show would return as a 2-hour live event in the fall of 2018, but  no live event has been broadcast.

Episodes

Series overview

Season 1 (2011)
Season 1 consists of three one-hour pilot episodes.

Season 2 (2013)
Jason Silva takes over as the new host.

Season 3 (2013–14)
Often games are less intense than season 2 and experiments with random people on the street are done.

Season 4 (2014)
Graphics get an update. The show introduces new experts and illusionists/magicians.

Season 5 (2015)
Shocking fails, moments, and confusion show how the brain can be easily deterred from its goal. The show abandons the studio in favor of more real-life application.

Season 6 (2015)
How the brain acts and thinks is explored. The show continues to abandon the transparent studio for real-life experiences.

Season 7 (2016)
Episodes are now one hour. The show is told from a real-world perspective with Jason Silva outside in the world with real people. Small games the audience can play along with are shown as well.

Season 8 (2020)

Season 9 (2022)
The show is now a competition and takes place outside. Teams of 4 compete in challenges.  This show is separate from the seasons before it, and is a spin-off series.

Awards

References

External links

2011 American television series debuts
2010s American television series
2020s American television series
Adult education television series
American educational television series
American television series revived after cancellation
English-language television shows
National Geographic (American TV channel) original programming
Science education television series